Aqa Mir Ahmad (also Romanized as Āqā Mīr Aḩmad) is a village in Dehrud Rural District, Eram District, Dashtestan County, Bushehr Province, Iran. At the 2006 census, its population was 142, in 26 families.

References 

Populated places in Dashtestan County